The Seekofel is a mountain in the Dolomites on the border between South Tyrol and the Province of Belluno, Italy.

References 
 Alpenverein South Tyrol

External links 

Mountains of the Alps
Mountains of South Tyrol
Dolomites